Large Four Piece Reclining Figure 1972–73 (LH 629) is a bronze sculpture by Henry Moore.

Description
Relatively unusually for Moore's work, the cast is polished rather than patinated.  The highly abstract – almost surreal – sculpture comprises four pieces, with the composition reminiscent of a reclining human figure.

Casts
One cast is located outside the Louise M. Davies Symphony Hall at the intersection of Van Ness and Grove Streets in San Francisco's Civic Center, in the U.S. state of California. The work's estimated cost is between $60,000 and $85,000. The work was displayed in London's Gagosian Gallery in 2012.

Other casts are located at the Lamont Library, Harvard University, in Cambridge, Massachusetts, and at Yamanashi Prefectural Museum of Art in Kofu, Japan.  The artist's copy (cast 0) is at the Henry Moore Foundation in Perry Green, Hertfordshire.

See also

List of sculptures by Henry Moore
1973 in art

References

1973 sculptures
Bronze sculptures in California
Bronze sculptures in Japan
Bronze sculptures in Massachusetts
Bronze sculptures in the United Kingdom
Civic Center, San Francisco
Outdoor sculptures in Japan
Outdoor sculptures in San Francisco
Sculptures by Henry Moore
Sculptures in England
Outdoor sculptures in Massachusetts